This is a list of turnpike roads, built and operated by nonprofit turnpike trusts or private companies in exchange for the privilege of collecting a toll, in the U.S. states of Virginia and West Virginia, mainly in the 19th century. While most of the roads are now maintained as free public roads, some have been abandoned.


List

See also

References

Turnpikes